Chróścina may refer to the following places in Poland:
Chróścina, Lower Silesian Voivodeship (south-west Poland)
Chróścina, Brzeg County in Opole Voivodeship (south-west Poland)
Chróścina, Nysa County in Opole Voivodeship (south-west Poland)
Chróścina, Opole County in Opole Voivodeship (south-west Poland)